No Way Out is a 1987 American neo-noir political action thriller film directed by Roger Donaldson and starring Kevin Costner, Gene Hackman, Will Patton, and Sean Young. Howard Duff, George Dzundza, Jason Bernard, Fred Thompson, and Iman appear in supporting roles. The film is based on the 1946 novel The Big Clock by Kenneth Fearing, previously filmed as The Big Clock (1948) and Police Python 357 (1976).

Plot
In the opening scene of the movie, set in a house in Washington, DC, near the Pentagon, Lieutenant Commander Tom Farrell of the Office of Naval Intelligence is shown being debriefed by two other men.  He is tired and bloodied. His interrogators press him on how he came to meet Secretary of Defense David Brice.

The story flashes back six months. Farrell attends an inaugural ball, invited by his college buddy Scott Pritchard, who intends to introduce him to his boss, Secretary of Defense David Brice. There, Farrell also meets Susan Atwell, and the two leave together, beginning an affair. Soon after, Brice hires Farrell to act as his eyes and ears within the Central Intelligence Agency (CIA); the agency's senior figures seem to be hiding possible intelligence failures from congressional and White House oversight. Sam Hesselman, an old friend of Farrell's who now works as a programmer/analyst in the Pentagon's new computer center, is part of his team under Brice.

Atwell and Farrell's affair continues, even after Atwell reveals that she is also Brice's mistress. After Atwell and Farrell return from a romantic weekend, Brice visits her unexpectedly and becomes suspicious that she has another lover. When Atwell tells Brice to leave, he becomes enraged and accidentally pushes her to her death over an upstairs railing. Brice confesses what has happened to Pritchard. He suggests that Atwell's other lover could be conflated with a suspected KGB sleeper agent, code-named "Yuri". For several years, different American intelligence agencies have tried to uncover Yuri within their ranks without success; Brice and they are all convinced Yuri is a myth, designed by the Soviets to sow confusion and mistrust within American ranks. Pritchard argues that Atwell's murder could be spun as a matter of national security, and Yuri could be killed "in the line of duty" by operatives under Pritchard's control, clearing Brice from suspicion.

At Atwell's house, Pritchard discovers the negative of a photograph she had earlier taken of Farrell. The negative is blurry and does not show a recognizable face, but Hesselman attempts to have the image enhanced by computer, a process that may take days.
 
Army CID officers, commanded by Major Donovan, scour Atwell's apartment for evidence. Meanwhile, as his initial shock begins to wear away, Farrell realizes that Brice is the real murderer and that Pritchard is helping him cover up the crime. He also realizes that the physical evidence will make him the prime suspect. Farrell decides to play along with the bogus investigation until he can develop evidence linking Brice to Atwell, and defend himself against being charged with both murder and espionage.

Farrell learns that one piece of evidence is a Moroccan jewel box, a gift to Atwell from Brice. As any foreign gift must be registered with the State Department, Farrell gets Hesselman to "raid" State's computerized registry of such items, which should link the box to Brice, but the plan begins unraveling when Pritchard finds Atwell's address book and uses it to track down and question her friend Nina. She pretends not to recognize Farrell, but reveals that she knew that Atwell was dating Brice. Pritchard sends two former CIA assassins to eliminate her. Overhearing this, Farrell delays the assassins while warning Nina, who goes into hiding. This raises Pritchard's suspicions of Farrell.

Farrell convinces Hesselman to delay the photo enhancement by confiding to him that Farrell is the person in the photo, that he was in love with Atwell, and that Brice killed Atwell. The CID begins a room-by-room search of the Pentagon on the grounds that Yuri is somewhere in the building, but Farrell eludes the search by climbing into a ceiling vent. Believing that Farrell is delusional, Hesselman informs Pritchard about what he knows. Hesselman is then killed by Pritchard. Farrell manages to get into Brice's office, locks the door, and confronts him with the printout of the gift registry data. Brice improvises a different story to buy Farrell's silence. Pritchard, who is gay, killed Atwell out of jealousy of Brice's relationship with her. The devastated and betrayed Pritchard realizes he is cornered and shoots himself. When the guards finally break into the locked office, Brice tells them that Pritchard confessed to being Yuri, concluding the search for the spy.

Farrell quietly sends the printout by courier to the director of the CIA, a political rival of Brice's, then leaves the Pentagon as the finished image enhancement of the photograph positively reveals Farrell as Atwell's lover. Later, Farrell is picked up by two men while sitting despondently at Atwell's grave. They begin the interrogation of Farrell from the beginning of the film, demanding to know why things were so "poorly handled".

Farrell angrily confronts the chief interrogator, who is revealed to be not American, but Russian. Farrell has actually been Yuri the entire time—a deep cover Soviet agent raised as an American from a young age, working as a high-level mole inside the U.S. intelligence community. The KGB ordered Farrell to seduce Brice's mistress to gather intelligence. Farrell's handler, his landlord, tells him that America is no longer safe and that it is time for him to return to the Soviet Union. Revealing that he genuinely loved Susan Atwell, Farrell refuses, and tells his handlers that he is finished being a spy. Though the other KGB agents are ready to kill Farrell, his handler orders them to allow Farrell to escape, believing that Farrell will eventually return on his own. In the final scene, Farrell is seen driving away from the house, to meet an uncertain fate.

Cast

Production

Writing
The screenplay is based on Kenneth Fearing's 1946 novel The Big Clock.

Filming
Exteriors were shot on location in Baltimore, Annapolis, Arlington, Washington, DC, and Auckland, New Zealand, between April and June 1986. The film is dedicated to the memory of its director of photography John Alcott, who died after principal photography had wrapped in July 1986, over a year prior to the film's eventual release.

Music
The film features original music by Academy Award-winning composer Maurice Jarre.
The title song, "No Way Out", was performed by Paul Anka.

Reception

Box office
The film debuted at number two at the US box office after Stakeout with $4.3 million. The film's budget was an estimated $15 million; its total U.S. gross was $35.5 million.

Critical response
On Rotten Tomatoes, the film holds an approval rating of 91% based on 47 reviews, with an average rating of 7.4/10. The website's critics consensus states: "Roger Donaldson's modern spin on the dense, stylish suspense films of the 1940s features fine work from Gene Hackman and Sean Young, as well as the career-making performance that made Kevin Costner a star." On Metacritic, the film has a weighted average score of 77 out of 100, based on 18 critics, indicating "generally favorable reviews". Audiences polled by CinemaScore gave the film an average grade of "B+" on an A+ to F scale.

Roger Ebert gave the film 4 out of 4 stars, calling it "truly labyrinthine and ingenious." Richard Schickel of Time wrote, "Viewers who arrive at the movie five minutes late and leave five minutes early will avoid the setup and payoff for the preposterous twist that spoils this lively, intelligent remake of 1948's The Big Clock." Desson Thomson of The Washington Post wrote, "The film makes such good use of Washington and builds suspense so well that it transcends a plot bordering on ridiculous."

See also
Culture during the Cold War

References

External links

 Official website (MGM) 
 
 
 

1987 films
1980s crime thriller films
1987 LGBT-related films
1980s psychological thriller films
1980s spy films
1980s action drama films
American crime thriller films
American independent films
American LGBT-related films
Remakes of American films
American political thriller films
American thriller drama films
Cold War spy films
Films based on American novels
Films based on crime novels
Films based on military novels
Films directed by Roger Donaldson
Films set in Washington, D.C.
Films shot in Baltimore
Films shot in New Zealand
Films shot in Virginia
Films shot in Washington, D.C.
Films scored by Maurice Jarre
Orion Pictures films
1980s Russian-language films
Films about the United States Navy
American neo-noir films
1987 drama films
1980s English-language films
1980s American films